Cape MacDonald is a headland which rises to , forming the south side of the entrance to Odom Inlet, on the east coast of Palmer Land, Antarctica. It was discovered by members of the United States Antarctic Service (USAS) who explored this area by land and from the air in 1940, and named for J.E. MacDonald, field representative and secretary of the USAS.

References

Headlands of Palmer Land